Leamy Avenue station is a SEPTA Route 101 trolley station in Springfield Township, Delaware County, Pennsylvania. It is officially located near Leamy Avenue and Rolling Road, but is directly on the southeast corner of these streets.

Trolleys arriving at this station travel between 69th Street Terminal in Upper Darby, Pennsylvania and Orange Street in Media, Pennsylvania. The station contains a green and white stucco shed with a roof on the south side of the tracks where people can go inside when it is raining, and a plexiglas and aluminum bus shelter on the north side of the tracks. A school is located on the northwest side of the tracks. At this location, the tracks run at a northeast-to-southwest direction. Leamy Avenue itself is divided as "West Leamy Avenue" northwest of the grade crossing, and "East Leamy Avenue" southeast of the grade crossing. Southwest of this stop tracks narrow down from two to one until the Route 101 line approaches the Pine Ridge stop.

Station layout

External links

YouTube Video of Leamy Avenue Station
 Station from Leamy Avenue from Google Maps Street View

SEPTA Media–Sharon Hill Line stations